Half-Fare Hare is a 1956 Warner Bros. Merrie Melodies cartoon directed by Robert McKimson. The short was released on August 18, 1956, and stars Bugs Bunny.

Plot
Bugs Bunny boards the Chattanooga Choo Choo and finds two hoboes who look and act like Ralph Kramden and Ed Norton, from The Honeymooners TV show, who want to eat Bugs after being hungry for days.

Summary 
It was a snowy winter day, and a newspaper landed near a train station and at the same time, Bugs Bunny arrives and looks at the newspaper, saying that a local carrot crop freeze. And despite, that he doesn't have a drove, Bugs decided to hop on a train to Chattanooga and shouts, "C'mon, Chattanooga Choo-Choo!"

In a choo-choo train, two men named Ralph and Ed are in one of the cars.

Music
The cartoon features the song Carolina in the Morning, rather than the more obvious choice  Chattanooga Choo Choo; Carolina in the Mornings faster melodic rhythm and emphatic downbeats complement the timing of the action in the cartoon.

Censorship
ABC censored the part where Norton offers to attend to Bugs' scarf and he hangs Bugs on a coat hanger with the scarf hanger and another scene where Norton is cooking Ralph in a pot, presumably because of the violent nature.

References

External links

 

1956 films
1956 animated films
1956 short films
Merrie Melodies short films
Warner Bros. Cartoons animated short films
Films directed by Robert McKimson
Fictional hoboes
Films scored by Carl Stalling
Films set on trains
Bugs Bunny films
1950s Warner Bros. animated short films
Films produced by Edward Selzer
1950s English-language films
The Honeymooners